Lemminkäinen or Lemminki is a prominent figure in Finnish mythology.  He is one of the heroes of the Kalevala, where his character is a composite of several separate heroes of oral poetry. He is usually depicted as young and good-looking, with wavy red hair.

Description

The original, mythological Lemminkäinen is a shamanistic figure. In the Kalevala, he has been blended together with epic war-heroes Kaukomieli/Kaukamoinen and Ahti Saarelainen. 

In one myth, he drowns in the river of Tuonela (the underworld) in trying to capture or kill the black swan that lives there as part of an attempt, as Ilmarinen once made, to win a daughter of Louhi as his wife. In a tale somewhat reminiscent of Isis' search for Osiris, Lemminkäinen's mother searches heaven and earth to find her son. Finally, she learns of his fate and asks Ilmarinen to fashion her a rake of copper with which to dredge her son's body from the river of Tuonela. Thus equipped, she descends into the underworld in search of her son. On the banks of the river of the underworld, she rakes up first Lemminkäinen's tunic and shoes, and then, his maimed and broken body. Unrelenting, she continues her work until every piece of Lemminkäinen's body is recovered. Sewing the parts together and offering prayers to the gods, the mother tries to restore Lemminkäinen to life, but while she succeeds in remaking his body, his life is still absent. Then, she entreats a bee to ascend to the halls of the over-god Ukko and fetch from there a drop of honey as ointment that would bring Lemminkäinen back to life. Only with such a potent remedy is the hero finally restored.

One of the challenges Lemminkäinen faced was a character named Surma. Surma was a terrible beast which embodied sudden, violent death and guarded the gates of the Tuonela to prevent escape. Surma is often described as being a large dog with a snake-tail and can turn people into stone (with a stare). An often-used Finnish metaphor is surman suuhun "into Surma's mouth", as if the victim was mauled to death by Surma.

Lemminkäinen in arts
Lemminkäinen is the subject of the four-part "Lemminkäinen Suite" by Jean Sibelius, and of an overture by Väinö Haapalainen, both of them Finnish composers.

The 2007 album (Silent Waters) of Finnish metal band Amorphis is about the story of Lemminkäinen.

The 2008 song (River of Tuoni) by Finnish metal band Amberian Dawn is about Lemminkäinen's mother's search for  him in the river of Tuoni. 

Lemminkäinen appears as Lemminkal Heikkinen the Warrior-Mage in Mercedes Lackey's 500 Kingdoms Series' homage to Sámi, among other Scandinavian and northern European myths and legends, The Snow Queen (2008). 

The 2018 song The Bee by Finnish metal band Amorphis also references the story of Lemminkäinen and of the bee entrusted by his mother to retrieve honey from the halls of the over-god Ukko.

Lemminkäinen is the protagonist of the 1959 film, The Day the Earth Froze.

The Dungeons & Dragons character Mordenkainen is partially named after him.

Lemminkäinen in Films
  "Back to Lemminkäinen" – (Documentary Series, 2020)

Gallery

See also
 Baldr
 Temple of Lemminkäinen

References

Books

 

Fictional heroes
Finnish mythology
Heroes in mythology and legend
Characters in the Kalevala
Karelian-Finnish folklore